The 2017–18 Loyola Ramblers men's basketball team represented Loyola University Chicago during the 2017–18 NCAA Division I men's basketball season. The Ramblers, led by seventh-year head coach Porter Moser, played their home games at the Joseph J. Gentile Arena in Chicago. They were members of the Missouri Valley Conference. With a win against Evansville on February 18, 2018, Loyola clinched at least a share of its first-ever Missouri Valley Conference regular season championship. With a win over Southern Illinois on February 21, the Ramblers clinched the outright MVC championship. The Ramblers defeated Northern Iowa, Bradley, and Illinois State to win the MVC tournament. As a result, the Ramblers received the conference's automatic bid to the NCAA tournament. As the No. 11 seed in the South Region, they upset No. 6-seeded Miami (FL) on a last second three-pointer. In the Second Round, they defeated No. 3-seeded Tennessee to earn the school's first trip to the Sweet Sixteen since 1985. They then defeated Nevada in the Sweet Sixteen and Kansas State in the Elite Eight to advance to the Final Four for the first time since 1963. Their Cinderella run ended with a loss to the eventual runner-up Michigan in the national semifinal.

Previous season
The Ramblers finished the 2016–17 season 18–14, 8–10 in MVC play to finish in fifth place. They lost to Southern Illinois in the quarterfinals of the MVC tournament.

Offseason

Departures

Incoming transfers

2017 recruiting class

Preseason
In the conference's preseason poll, the Ramblers were picked to finish in third place in the MVC. Senior forward Aundre Jackson was named to the preseason All-MVC first team.

Roster

Schedule and results
In their tenth game on December 6, they upset No. 5 ranked Florida, for the school's first win against a ranked opponent since a February 15, 2009 win over No. 15 Butler and the first against a top 5 team since a December 22, 1984 victory over No. 4 Illinois.

|-
!colspan=9 style=|Exhibition

|-
!colspan=9 style=| Non-conference regular season

|-
!colspan=9 style=| Missouri Valley regular season

|-
!colspan=9 style=| Missouri Valley Tournament

|-
!colspan=9 style=| NCAA tournament

Rankings

References

External links
Full Schedule and Results

Loyola
Loyola Ramblers men's basketball seasons
Loyola
NCAA Division I men's basketball tournament Final Four seasons
Loyola Ramblers men
Loyola Ramblers men
2010s in Chicago
2017 in Illinois
Loyola Ramblers men